Andriy Vitaliyovych Kovenko (born November 25, 1973) is a Ukrainian race walker. He is a four-time national champion for the 20 km race walk.

At age thirty-four, Kovenko made his official debut for the 2008 Summer Olympics in Beijing, where he competed in the men's 20 km race walk. He finished the race in twenty-fourth place by two seconds behind South Korea's Kim Hyun-Sub, with a time of 1:22:59.

References

External links

NBC Olympics Profile

Ukrainian male racewalkers
Living people
Olympic athletes of Ukraine
Athletes (track and field) at the 2008 Summer Olympics
Sportspeople from Vinnytsia
1973 births